The 1926 Wallsend by-election was held on 21 July 1926.  The by-election was held due to the resignation of the incumbent Labour MP, Patrick Hastings.  It was won by the Labour candidate Margaret Bondfield.

References

1926 in England
Metropolitan Borough of North Tyneside
1926 elections in the United Kingdom
By-elections to the Parliament of the United Kingdom in Northumberland constituencies
20th century in Northumberland